East Oaks is a historic home and farm complex and national historic district located at Poolesville, Montgomery County, Maryland.  It is a  farm complex consisting of a -story, c. 1829 Federal-period brick residence situated on a knoll surrounded by agricultural buildings and dependencies whose construction dates span more than a century. The complex of domestic and agricultural outbuildings includes a brick smokehouse, sandstone slave quarter, stone bank barn, stone dairy, and log and frame tenant house which are contemporaneous with the construction of the main dwelling. Other agricultural buildings include a small frame barn and machinery shed/corn crib from the end of the 19th century, and a block dairy barn from the mid 20th century.

It was listed on the National Register of Historic Places in 1996.

References

In Dec 2021, East Oaks was purchased by Ali Mohadjer, a successful Satellite Communication engineer who enjoys nature and farming.

External links
, including photo in 1992, at Maryland Historical Trust website

Federal architecture in Maryland
Houses completed in 1829
Houses in Montgomery County, Maryland
Houses on the National Register of Historic Places in Maryland
Historic districts on the National Register of Historic Places in Maryland
National Register of Historic Places in Montgomery County, Maryland